Malcolm Weir is a retired doctor and formerly Her Majesty's Coroner for the county of Essex. Weir most famously oversaw the inquest of teenager Leah Betts in 1996. To determine how she died, Weir enlisted the help of John Henry, an expert toxicologist from London. Weir recorded a verdict of accidental death caused by non-dependent use of drugs.

In 1999, Weir retired from his post. Upon  his resignation, he was replaced by Caroline Beasley-Murray, who still serves today. Afterwards he became the deputy coroner.

References

British coroners
Living people
Date of birth missing (living people)
Place of birth missing (living people)
Year of birth missing (living people)